Sebastian Albert (born 26 February 1987) is a German footballer who plays for NOFV-Oberliga Süd club FC Grimma.

Career
He made his professional debut in the 2. Bundesliga with Hansa Rostock on 16 February 2009 when he started a game against SC Freiburg.

References

1987 births
Footballers from Leipzig
21st-century German people
Living people
German footballers
Germany youth international footballers
Association football midfielders
FC Hansa Rostock players
RB Leipzig players
ZFC Meuselwitz players
2. Bundesliga players
Regionalliga players
Oberliga (football) players